The 2024 Pac-12 Conference men's basketball tournament is a postseason men's basketball tournament for the Pac-12 Conference held March 6–9, 2024, at T-Mobile Arena on the Las Vegas Strip in Paradise, Nevada.  The tournament winner of the conference tournament will receive the conference's automatic bid to the NCAA tournament.

Seeds 

The bracket will be set in March 2024.  All 12 schools are scheduled to participate in the tournament. The seedings will be determined upon completion of regular season play.  The winning percentage of the teams in conference play determined tournament seedings. There are tiebreakers in place to seed teams with identical conference records. The top four teams receive a bye to the quarterfinals.  Tie-breaking procedures for determining all tournament seeding is:

 For two-team tie:

 Results of head-to-head competition during the regular season.
 Each team's record (won-lost percentage) vs. the team occupying the highest position in the final regular standings, and then continuing down through the standings until one team gains an advantage. When arriving at another group of tied teams while comparing records, use each team's record (won-lost percentage) against the collective tied teams as a group (prior to that group's own tie-breaking procedure), rather than the performance against individual tied teams.
 Won-lost percentage against all Division I opponents.
 Coin toss conducted by the Commissioner or designee.

 For multiple-team tie:

 Results (won-lost percentage) of collective head-to-head competition during the regular season among the tied teams.
 If more than two teams are still tied, each of the tied team's record (won-lost percentage) vs. the team occupying the highest position in the final regular season standings, and then continuing down through the standings, eliminating teams with inferior records, until one team gains an advantage.When arriving at another group of tied teams while comparing records, use each team's record (won-lost percentage) against the collective tied teams as a group (prior to that group's own tie-breaking procedure), rather than the performance against individual tied teams. After one team has an advantage and is seeded, all remaining teams in the multiple-team tie-breaker will repeat the multiple-team tie-breaking procedure. If at any point the multiple-team tie is reduced to two teams, the two-team tie-breaking procedure will be applied.
 Won-lost percentage against all Division I opponents.
 Coin toss conducted by the Commissioner or designee.

Schedule

Bracket
* denotes overtime period

Game statistics

First round

Quarterfinals

Semifinals

Championship

Awards and honors

Hall of Honor  
The 2024 class of the Pac-12 Hall of Honor will be honored on March  during a ceremony prior to the tournament semifinals.  The class includes:

Team and tournament leaders 
Source:

All-Tournament Team

Most Outstanding Player

Tournament notes 

 The following teams at the start of the tournament were ranked in the top 25.
 The following were extended invitations to the 2023 NCAA tournament:
 The following teams were extended invitations to the 2023 National Invitation Tournament:

References 

Pac-12 Conference men's basketball tournament
Basketball competitions in the Las Vegas Valley
College basketball tournaments in Nevada
College sports tournaments in Nevada